Lebara Group is a telecommunications company providing services using the mobile virtual network operator (MVNO) business model in the United Kingdom, France, Denmark, the Netherlands, Germany, Saudi Arabia, Spain, Switzerland and Australia. Lebara provides pay-as-you-go and contract based mobile SIM cards in these countries, and its brand is also used under license in four other countries.

History 
Lebara was founded in 2001 by UK-based Ratheesan Yoganathan, Rasiah Ranjith Leon and Baskaran Kandiah. The name Lebara was coined from the first two letters of each of the founders' names. At launch the company's initial product was international telephone calling cards, sold through independent mobile phone shops. In 2004, Lebara launched its first mobile virtual network, a low-cost international service in the Netherlands, selling SIM cards using mobile carrier Telfort, a subsidiary of KPN. After finding success it subsequently launched operations in other European countries including the UK (2007), France, Spain, Switzerland, Germany (2010) and Denmark.

Lebara's Swiss operations (Lebara GmbH, Zurich) was sold on July 1, 2013 to Sunrise Communications.

In September 2017, Lebara Group B.V. was sold to Switzerland-based Palmarium Advisors AG. The Spanish operation of Lebara (Lebara España SL) was sold to MASMOVIL Group in November 2018. In 2019 bondholders of Lebara (under holding company Vieo B.V.) took control of the company.

Operations
The company currently operates in the UK, France, Denmark, the Netherlands and Germany - it has at least 3.5 million customers as of 2017. It has also entered into brand licence agreements for use of its trademarks in Australia, Switzerland, Saudi Arabia and Spain.

In 2017 Lebara launched its first postpaid monthly contract SIMs in the Netherlands, as part of a move to appeal to a wider customer base.

Today Lebara focuses on traditional international calling market as well as offering SIM-only plans and post pay services. Lebara plans to offer 5G services as these become available.

References

External links 
 Official website

Mobile virtual network operators
Telecommunications companies of the Netherlands
Companies based in North Holland
Telecommunications companies established in 2001
Mobile phone companies of Saudi Arabia